Tocantinópolis Esporte Clube, commonly referred to as Tocantinópolis, is a Brazilian professional club based in Tocantinópolis, Tocantins founded on 1 January 1989. It competes in the Campeonato Brasileiro Série D, the fourth tier of Brazilian football, as well as in the Campeonato Tocantinense, the top flight of the Tocantins state football league.

Tocantinópolis is the second-best ranked team from Tocantins in CBF's national club ranking, being placed 146th overall.

History
The club was founded on January 1, 1989. They competed for the first time in the Série C in 1997, when they were eliminated in the Second Stage of the competition. The club won the Campeonato Tocantinense in 1993 and in 2002. They competed once in the Série A in 2000, the competition was named Copa João Havelange at the time, and they reached the Second Stage of the Copa João Havelange Group Green and White. The club competed again the Série C in 2002, when they were eliminated in the Second Stage by Nacional. They competed in the Copa do Brasil in 2003, when they were eliminated in the First Round by Vitória. Tocantinópolis was eliminated in the First Stage in the 2005 by Remo.

Stadium
Tocantinópolis play their home games at Ribeirão. The stadium has a maximum capacity of 8,000 people.

Honours
 Campeonato Tocantinense
 Winners (5): 1993, 2002, 2015, 2021, 2022

External links
 Tocantinópolis on Globo Esporte

References

Association football clubs established in 1989
Football clubs in Tocantins
Football clubs in Brazil
1989 establishments in Brazil